Jainad or Jainath is a mandal in Adilabad district in the state of Telangana in India.

Jainad is well known for ancient Shri Laxmi Narayana Swamy Temple.

Demographics
According to Indian census, 2001, the demographic details of Jainad mandal is as follows:
 Total Population: 	44,805	in 9,573 Households. 	
 Male Population: 	22,339	and Female Population: 	22,466		
 Children Under 6-years of age: 6,049	(Boys -	3,140 and Girls - 2,909)
 Total Literates: 	19,596

Jainad village has a population of 4,349 in 2001.

Villages
The villages in Jainad mandal includes.
52 (29 GramPanchayathies) Villages in Jainad Mandal : Ada, Akoli, Bahadurpur, Balapur, Bhoraj, Deepaiguda, Gimma, Guda, Jainad, Jamini, Kamai, Kamta, Kanpamediguda, Karanji, Khapri, Korta, Kowtha, Kura, Laxmipur, Makoda, Mandagada, Mangurla, Nirala, Pardi (B), Pardi (K), Pendalwada, Pipparawada, Pusai, Sangvi (K), Sawapoor and Taroda.

References 

Mandals in Adilabad district